Emblemariopsis ramirezi is a species of chaenopsid blenny known from Venezuela, in the western central Atlantic ocean. The specific name honours Humberto Ramirez, who found this species and drew Cervigón's attention to it.

References
 Cervigón, F., 1999 Coralliozetus ramirezi sp. n. Una nueva especie de Coralliozetus de las costas de Venezuela (Pisces: Chaenopsidae). , Departamento de Investigaciones Museo del Mar No. 1: 1–4.

ramirezi
Fish of Venezuela
Fish described in 1999
Taxa named by Fernando Cervigón